Kekerten Territorial Park is a park on Kekerten Island, about  south of Pangnirtung, in the Qikiqtaaluk Region of Nunavut, Canada.

History
Where the park is now was site of a whaling station established in 1840 by William Penny, and the Cumberland Sound area became a major whale hunting ground. The British and American whalers relied on local Inuit knowledge in their quest for whales. Remains of the storehouses are still visible, as are the remains of a whaling ship.

Access
The only means of getting to the park is a 3-hour boat ride from Pangnirtung in the summer or a longer trip in winter by snowmobile.

References

External link
Kekerten Territorial Park at Nunavut Parks and Special Places

Parks in Qikiqtaaluk Region
Year of establishment missing
Whaling stations in Canada
Territorial parks of Nunavut